A heliocentric orbit (also called circumsolar orbit) is an orbit around the barycenter of the Solar System, which is usually located within or very near the surface of the Sun. All planets, comets, and asteroids in the Solar System, and the Sun itself are in such orbits, as are many artificial probes and pieces of debris. The moons of planets in the Solar System, by contrast, are not in heliocentric orbits, as they orbit their respective planet (although the Moon has a convex orbit around the Sun).

The barycenter of the Solar System, while always very near the Sun, moves through space as time passes, depending on where other large bodies in the Solar System, such as Jupiter and other large gas planets, are located at that time. A similar phenomenon allows the detection of exoplanets by way of the radial-velocity method.

The helio- prefix is derived from the Greek word "ἥλιος", meaning "Sun", and also Helios, the personification of the Sun in Greek mythology.

The first spacecraft to be put in a heliocentric orbit was Luna 1 in 1959. An incorrectly timed upper-stage burn caused it to miss its planned impact on the Moon.

Trans-Mars injection 

A trans-Mars injection (TMI) is a heliocentric orbit in which a  propulsive maneuver is used to set a spacecraft on a trajectory, also known as Mars transfer orbit, which will place it as far as Mars orbit.

Every two years, low-energy transfer windows open up, which allow movement between planets with the lowest possible energy requirements. Transfer injections can place spacecraft into either a Hohmann transfer orbit or bi-elliptic transfer orbit. Trans-Mars injections can be either a single maneuver burn, such as that used by the NASA MAVEN orbiter in 2013, or a series of perigee kicks, such as that used by the ISRO Mars Orbiter Mission in 2013.

See also 
 Astrodynamics
 Earth's orbit
 Geocentric orbit
 Heliocentrism
 List of artificial objects in heliocentric orbit
 List of orbits
 Low-energy transfer

References 

Orbits
Astrodynamics
Spacecraft propulsion
Orbital maneuvers
Exploration of Mars